Volleyball teams around the world that have won international titles come from all the FIVB-affiliated confederations, such as the Asian Volleyball Confederation (AVC) in Asia and Oceania; Confederación Sudamericana de Voleibol (CSV) in South America; African Volleyball Confederation (CAVB) in Africa; European Volleyball Confederation (CEV) in Europe; and North, Central America and Caribbean Volleyball Confederation (NORCECA) in North America.

Regional titles are not included in this list as these competitions are not recognised by FIVB.

Top 10

Countries with most teams in top 10

Countries with most titles in top 10

References

Volleyball-related lists